Friedrich Wilhelm III (b. Altenburg, 12 July 1657 – d. Altenburg, 14 April 1672), was a duke of Saxe-Altenburg.

He was the second son of Friedrich Wilhelm II, Duke of Saxe-Altenburg and Magdalene Sybille of Saxony, his second wife.

Life

The death of his older brother Christian (1663) made him the new heir of the Duchy of Saxe-Altenburg. When his father died in 1669, Friedrich Wilhelm III succeeded him; but, because he was only twelve years old, his maternal uncles, Elector Johann Georg II of Saxony and Duke Maurice of Saxe-Zeitz, assumed the guardianship of the new duke and the regency of the duchy.

Only three years later, the young duke died of smallpox shortly after returning from a trip to Dresden. His burial took place three months later, on 17 July 1672 at his father's tomb in the church of Schloss Altenburg. With his death, the branch of Saxe-Altenburg, founded in 1603, became extinct in the direct male line.

Saxe-Altenburg was split between the branches of Saxe-Gotha and Saxe-Weimar; but, on the basis of the will of the Duke Johann Philipp of Saxe-Altenburg (Friedrich Wilhelm III's uncle) the greater part of the duchy was retained by Saxe-Gotha, because they were the descendants of Elisabeth Sophie, the only daughter of Johann Philipp, who declared her the general heiress of the family in case of the extinction of the male line.

Ancestors

References 
 August Beck: Friedrich Wilhelm III. In: Allgemeine Deutsche Biographie (ADB). Band 7, Duncker & Humblot, Leipzig 1877, p. 794.

External links 
 Magister Samuel Haberland: Alte Erinnerungen aus Nobitz II. Band in: kg-nobitz.de [retrieved 21 November 2016].

1657 births
1672 deaths
House of Saxe-Altenburg
People from Altenburg
Dukes of Saxe-Altenburg
Monarchs who died as children